Pastos Bons is a municipality in the state of Maranhão in the Northeast region of Brazil. It gives its name to Pastos Bons Formation and Batrachomimus pastosbonensis.

See also
List of municipalities in Maranhão

References

Municipalities in Maranhão